Van Susteren is a toponymic surname, literally meaning "from Susteren". 

Notable people with the surname include:

Greta Van Susteren (born 1954), American television news anchor
Lise Van Susteren, American forensic psychiatrist

Toponymic surnames
Surnames of Dutch origin